Theix-Noyalo is a commune in the Morbihan department of western France. Theix is the municipal seat. The municipality was established on 1 January 2016 and consists of the former communes of Theix and Noyalo.

Population
The population data given in the table below refer to the commune in its geography as of January 2020.

See also 
Communes of the Morbihan department

References 

Theixnoyalo

Communes nouvelles of Morbihan
Populated places established in 2016
2016 establishments in France